The 2016–17 Radford Highlanders men's basketball team represented Radford University during the 2016–17 NCAA Division I men's basketball season. The Highlanders, led by sixth year head coach Mike Jones, played their home games at the Dedmon Center in Radford, Virginia as members of the Big South Conference. They finished the season 14–18, 8–10 in Big South play to finish in a sixth place. They received the No. 6 seed in the Big South tournament where they defeated Liberty in the quarterfinals to advance to the semifinals where they lost to Campbell.

Previous season
The Highlanders finished the 2015–16 season 16–15, 9–9 in Big South play to finish in seventh place. They lost to Presbyterian in the first round of the Big South tournament.

Roster

Schedule

|-
!colspan=9 style=| Non-conference Regular season

|-
!colspan=9 style=| Big South Conference regular season

|-
!colspan=9 style=| Big South tournament

References 

Radford Highlanders men's basketball seasons
Radford
Radford
Radford